Bolivia competed at the 1996 Summer Olympics in Atlanta, United States. Eight competitors, six men and two women, took part in nine events in five sports.

Athletics

Men
Track & road events

Women
Track & road events

Cycling

Track

Sprints

Diving

Men

Fencing

Swimming

Men

Women

See also
 Bolivia at the 1995 Pan American Games

References

External links
Official Olympic Reports

Nations at the 1996 Summer Olympics
1996 Summer Olympics
Summer Olympics